Joseph Scott (June 15, 1918 – January 12, 1997) was an American Negro league first baseman in the 1940s.

A native of Shreveport, Louisiana, Scott made his Negro leagues debut in 1946 with the Los Angeles White Sox. He played for the Birmingham Black Barons in 1948, recording a hit and an RBI in three plate appearances for Birmingham during the 1948 Negro World Series. Scott went on to play minor league baseball in the 1950s for several teams, including the Farnham Pirates, St. Hyacinthe Saints, and Hot Springs Bathers.
 He died in Los Angeles, California in 1997 at age 78.

References

External links
 and Seamheads

1918 births
1997 deaths
Birmingham Black Barons players
Los Angeles White Sox players
20th-century African-American sportspeople